Courage is a 1930 American pre-Code drama film,  produced by Warner Bros. in 1929 and released early in 1930. The movie is based on a stage play of the same name by Tom Barry which was a hit on Broadway in 1928.

Plot
Bennett plays Mary Colbrook, the widowed mother of seven children living in Sioux City, Iowa. She moves with them to Cambridge, Massachusetts to educate her children with culture and give them every advantage.

Mary, who is unversed in financial matters, soon faces poverty for herself and her children. She takes out a loan from an unscrupulous lender, James Rudlin, who neglects to ask her for collateral. Mary is later only able to partially pay her creditors.

Muriel, Mary's eldest daughter, is shocked by her mother's actions and attempts to sacrifice herself to Rudlin to clear her mother's obligations, although she is engaged to marry a well-to-do Harvard undergraduate. A stern aunt appears and is hell bent on taking her brother's children away from their mother. The aunt manages to turn Bennett's children against their mother, with the exception of her son, Bill, who, fortuitously, inherits the fortune of a neighbouring spinster which allows Mary to be reunited with the rest of her children. Mary discovers noble qualities in Rudlin and agrees to become his future wife.

Cast

Belle Bennett as Mary Colbrook 
Marian Nixon as Muriel Colbrook 
Rex Bell as Lynn Willard 
Richard Tucker as James Rudlin 
Leon Janney as Bill Colbrook 
Blanche Friderici as Aunt Caroline 
Charlotte Henry as Gwendolyn Colbrook 
Dorothy Ward as Gladys Colbrook 
Byron Sage as Richard Colbrook 
Don Marion as Vincent Colbrook 
Carter De Haven Jr. as Reginald Colbrook

Preservation
The film is believed to be lost. No film elements [other than stills] are known to exist. The complete soundtrack, however, survives on Vitaphone disks.

See also
List of lost films
List of early Warner Bros. talking features

References

External links 
 
allmovie/synopsis; Courage

1930 films
Lost American films
Warner Bros. films
1930s English-language films
Films directed by Archie Mayo
1930 drama films
American black-and-white films
American drama films
Lost drama films
1930 lost films
1930s American films